Srinivasa Ramanujan (1887–1920) was an Indian mathematician.

Ramanujan may also refer to:

 Ramanujan (name), a Tamil and Malayalam name
 Ramanujan (film), a 2014 film
 Ramanujan College, a constituent college of the University of Delhi
 Ramanujan IT City, an information technology (IT) special economic zone
 Ramanuja, an eleventh century Indian philosopher, Hindu theologian and social reformer
 Amita Ramanujan

See also
 List of things named after Srinivasa Ramanujan
 Ramanujan prime
 Ramanujan Prize (disambiguation)
 Ramanujan summation, a technique invented by the mathematician Srinivasa Ramanujan